Condell Park, a suburb of local government area City of Canterbury-Bankstown, is 21 kilometres south-west of the Sydney central business district, in the state of New South Wales, Australia, and is a part of the south-western Sydney region. The postcode of Condell Park is 2200, which is shared with Bankstown and Bankstown Aerodrome.

History
Condell Park was named after Ousley Condell, an engineer who arrived on 8 May 1829 on the barque Swiftsure with 13 other settlers. He applied for a position in the public service and was granted four  adjoining lots in 1830 that he called Condell Park.

Black Charlie's Hill, located in Simmat Avenue Condell Park, was named after a local identity whose nickname was 'Black Charlie'. His real name is said to have been Charles Luzon or Charlie Lopez, a man of Aboriginal ancestry. He lived near Edgar Street, South Yagoona and like others in the area, during the early 1900s, grew vegetables that he carried off to the market by horse and cart. His home was constructed of corrugated iron. Black Charlie was said to fire a single shot each evening promptly at 9pm but the reason was never disclosed. Some suggested he was hunting rabbits, others to warn of the approach of aircraft.

Bankstown Bunker

The Bankstown Bunker was an exact replica of the underground Ops rooms of wartime England, which directed Britain's air defence fighter plane attacks on the invading German Luftwaffe. It had all the attenuated fixtures necessary to run a top secret operational defence base. The bunker was equipped with its own code room, plotting rooms, two escape tunnels and a radio transmitter room. In the centre of the bunker was a large room of about two stories in height. This was the main Ops room and control centre for all RAAF Missions in the Pacific area. The room also had a large map of the South West Pacific theater of World War II.

The bunker still exists and access can be obtained through one of the old air vents. The entry point is located on private property in the backyard of a dwelling with an access tunnel running under a public park in which the bunker is buried. This is located at the end of Taylor Street, which can also be found on the corner of Marion and Edgar Streets, Condell Park. In 1976 the entire site was redeveloped into town houses which cover most of the land area. The area now comprises a number of separate complexes or "Closes" containing eight to eleven villas. Each Close is named appropriately after planes which flew from Bankstown during the Second World War.

Heritage listings

Condell Park has a number of heritage-listed sites, including: 
 Bankstown Bunker

Demographics
In the 2016 census, Condell Park recorded a population of 11,574 people.

The median age of the Condell Park population was 33 years, five years below the national median of 38.

53.4% of people were born in Australia. The next most common countries of birth were Lebanon 9.7%, Vietnam 9.4%, The former Yugoslav Republic of Macedonia 1.5%, Italy 1.5% and Greece 1.4%.

29.1% of people spoke only English at home. Other languages spoken at home included Arabic 29.5%, Vietnamese 13.9%, Greek 4.7%, Macedonian 2.7% and Italian 2.3%.

The most common responses for religion were Islam 26.8%, Catholic 25.6%, Eastern Orthodox 10.2% and No Religion 9.3%.

Commercial area

There are a number of shops in Condell Park, including IGA supermarket, several chemists and numerous other shops and restaurants. Most of the shops are located on a small section of Simmat Avenue, with a few other shops scattered around the suburb.

There is also a commercial area on the corner of Chapel and Canterbury Roads, which is commonly known as Manahan.

Schools
Condell Park Public School (K-6)
Condell Park High School (7-12)
Condell Park Christian School (K-10)

Churches
Condell Park Anglican Church

Sport and recreation
Condell Park is home to Club Condell Park (formerly Bankstown Trotting Club), next to where Bankstown Markets are held every Sunday. The sporting venue Deverall Park is home to an extensive number of netball courts, 6 tennis courts, and the Bankstown Basketball Stadium which is the largest basketball stadium in Australia. Kinch Reserve, next to the Basketball Stadium, is home to Condell Park Football Club.

References

External links

More info on the Bankstown Bunker including pictures of when it was in operation during The Second World War.
Bankstown Bunker images
Community Profile
Condell Park Football Club

City of Canterbury-Bankstown
Suburbs of Sydney
Populated places established in 1830
1830 establishments in Australia